The Springfield Xtreme are a junior 'C' club based in Oakbank, Manitoba. Established in 1988, the team compete in the Hanover Tache Junior Hockey League.

Springfield captured their first league championship in 2017 defeating Red River Mudbugs in six games.

Season-by-season 
Note: GP = Games played, W = Wins, L = Losses, OTL = Overtime Losses, SOL = Shootout Losses, Pts = Points

See also
List of ice hockey teams in Manitoba

References

External links
 Springfield Xtreme
 Hanover Tache Junior Hockey League

Ice hockey teams in Manitoba
Sport in Eastman Region, Manitoba